Mikhail I may refer to:

 Mikhail of Vladimir (died in 1176)
 Michael of Russia (Mikhail I Fyodorovich Romanov) (1596–1645)